Percy Harrison (1902 – after 1922) was an English professional footballer who played as a goalkeeper.

References

1902 births
People from Huthwaite
Footballers from Nottinghamshire
English footballers
Association football goalkeepers
Grimsby Town F.C. players
Denaby United F.C. players
English Football League players
Year of death missing